Michael John Campion (born December 4, 1962) is an American producer, entrepreneur, musician and songwriter. He is known for resurrecting the guitar company Danelectro.

Early life
Michael Campion was born in Moses Lake, Washington. His family moved to Orange County, California, while he was in grade school. Campion formed a band called "Westbound" in middle school and started playing high school dances before he could drive. He produced his first record for his high school, when he was 17 years old.

Career

Bands
In 1980, Campion formed "Surf City" (originally "The Surf City Boys"), a band focusing on the music of The Beach Boys and Jan and Dean. While playing at Knott's Berry Farm, he met John Stamos, who joined the band on stage. Stamos would later introduce Campion to The Beach Boys and Jan and Dean, with whom Campion would eventually tour. Through these events Campion met songwriting partner Randell Kirsch and joined forces for a duo project under the name of "C&K".  Campion and Kirsch reunited in 2005 to release a gospel vocal album, under the name of "Feather".

Jingles
At a corporate gig, Campion was approached by Wild West Stores to produce a jingle for a television & radio campaign based on The Beach Boys #1 hit, I Get Around, with Campion's production and rewrite of the lyrics. Under the name of "Pacific Productions", Campion would spend the next couple of years writing and producing dozens of jingles and music campaigns, often calling upon the vocal talents of Beach Boys' band members like Jeffrey Foskett and Phil Bardowell.

L.A.B. Sound
In 1986 Campion bought into a boutique music store concept called "L.A.B. Sound" and opened a location in Orange County that strategically shared a wall with a recording studio owned by Frontline Records. Frontline dominated Christian radio in the late 80s and Campion contributed songs to several artists on their roster, including Crystal Lewis.

Danelectro

Musical Instruments
Campion met Steve Ridinger of EVETS Corporation in 1992. QWIK TUNE was the first project that they worked on together. The concept was to take Liquid-crystal display (LCD) technology and simulate the analog meters used in guitar tuners. Old school guitar tuners with analog meters ruled the MI industry in the early 90s (selling at around $100). QWIK TUNE selling at $19.95, was accurate and disruptive to the market. In recent years, QWIK TUNE rebranded as SNARK Tuners.

Campion and Ridinger then saw an opportunity to reproduce the sounds of the most sought after "vintage" guitar pedals, in an affordable package. Many names were considered, but "Danelectro" had a simplistic beauty, history and mystique.

Musicians had been deprived from Danelectro products for nearly 30 years, when Campion and Ridinger introduced 3 new pedals under the brand name, at the Winter NAMM Show, in 1997.

Dealers from all over the world ordered mass quantities, but their number one question was: When are you coming out with guitars? In a rapid, but thorough design and development effort, Danelectro released their first model of guitar, (a replica of the 1956 "U2"), exactly one year later The Danelectro U2 was embraced by the industry and the demand for additional models set the course for the years to follow.

Tonal Creations
Tonal Creations combined Campion's experience in guitar manufacturing with creative advertising, by producing custom shaped guitars for high-profile companies to use as branding and marketing instruments. Guitars in the shapes of everything from hamburgers to cartoon characters were produced for clients like Mars, Incorporated for M&M's.

Music Epicenter
Campion left Danelectro in 2002 and dove back into songwriting, placing songs in a few television shows, like One Tree Hill, through agencies that demanded to own the song's publishing, in exchange for their placement efforts. Feeling that this was unfair, Campion formed "Music Epicenter", with partner and mentor songsmith, Chris Falson in 2003.

Campion shifted focus from song placement to finding a solution for an industry in rapid decline. Lack of stable distribution channels for new artists, inspired Campion, along with ME partner Chris Falson and James Langteaux to create "PeaPod Music", where he raised capital and filed a patent on this unique distribution and discovery process.

The Raymies
The Raymies was a youth-based entertainment project created by Campion, in which he also served as musical director and executive producer. As the project evolved, he raised funds for a television pilot, which he co-produced with Brillstein Entertainment Partners and John Stamos. The lead singers were two of Campion's three daughters (Kalina and Kiana).

In their three years together, The Raymies performed over 100 live shows from Los Angeles to New York and recorded nearly 40 songs written by Campion. Several of the songs found their way into other television and film projects. An animated version of The Raymies was developed for the kid based, online, virtual world of JumpStart, whose Raymies followers grew from 200,000 to 2,000,000 during their two-year collaboration.

In 2011, Campion struck a deal with Rainbow S.r.l. to develop a musical television series with Nickelodeon as a platform for Kalina and Kiana's music career. Campion served as Co-creator and Music Supervisor of the series and wrote much of  the music with his daughters. The show (recast) premiered in 2016 as Maggie & Bianca: Fashion Friends. and completed 78 episodes, (including guest appearances by Kalina & Kiana), over three seasons, airing internationally on Netflix, Nickelodeon and Disney.

Media Epicenter

Through experience gained from Maggie & Bianca, and having directed nearly two dozen music videos, Campion discovered a passion for storytelling beyond music, and launched his own production company - Media Epicenter, in late 2019. The launch was slowed by the COVID-19 Pandemic, but the company is back on course and currently has eight film & TV projects in various stages of development, ranging from unscripted to interactive animation. Media Epicenter began production on two documentaries in late 2022 and will launch their first docu-reality series in 2023.

Personal life
Campion married Lezlie Gibbs in 1988. Together they have three daughters: Kylie, Kalina and Kiana.

Credits

Discography
 Love Is the Answer - Pacifica, 1980, Kitchen Records - Credited Role: Producer, Vocals, Guitar
 City Lights - Surf City, 1983, Nu-Surf Records - Credited Role: Producer, Vocals, Guitar, Keys, Writer for Summer in Huntington and Sandy
 Girl of My Dreams - Surf City, 1984, Graham Street Records - Credited Role: Producer, Vocals, Guitar, Keys, Writer for Girl of My Dreams, I Love You More, One Last Ride, Little Lady
 I Want You to Know - Crossfire, 1985, Graham Street Records - Credited Role: Engineer, Co-producer, Backing Vocals
 Beyond the Charade - Crystal Lewis, 1987, Frontline Records - Credited Role: Backing Vocals, Writer for Frustrated, Runnin, Let Them Know, Tonight
 United We Stand / Divided We Fall - Benny Hester, 1990, Frontline Records - Credited Role: Backing Vocals
 New Life - Sharlyn & Rick Green, 1991, Santa Catalina Records - Credited Role: Engineer, Producer, Backing Vocals, Guitar
 Greatest Hits (Crystal Lewis album) - Crystal Lewis, 1991, Frontline Records - Credited Role: Writer for Frustrated
 Rewards of Wisdom - Thunder Bay, 1992, Santa Catalina Records - Credited Role: Producer, Arranger, Programmer, Vocals, Guitar, Bass, Keys, Writer for Rewards of Wisdom
 Twelve & Twelve - Jeffrey Foskett, 1997, Pioneer LDC / New Surf, Ltd. - Credited Role: Backing Vocals, Writer for I Don't Know
 Near Life Experience - Randell Kirsch, 1999, Dental Records - Credited Role: Backing Vocals
 The Best of Jeffrey Foskett - Jeffrey Foskett, 2001, Pioneer / New Surf - Credited Role: Backing Vocals, Writer for I Don't Know
 Santa Cruz - Papa Doo Run Run, 2001, Blue Pacific Records - Credited Role: Writer for One Last Ride
 Fragile Sunrise - Jeff Larson, 2002, New Surf Records - Credited Role: Backing Vocals
 Blue Plate Special - Papa Doo Run Run, 2002, Blue Pacific Records - Credited Role: Writer for One Last Ride 
 Swimming in the Make Believe - Jeff Larson, 2003, New Surf Records - Credited Role: Backing Vocals
 Cornerstone Christmas - Chris Falson & Friends, 2003, Music Epicenter - Credited Role: Producer, Vocals, Guitar
 One in a Million - Dennis Wilson Tribute, 2004, ESQ (Endless Summer Quarterly) - Credited Role: Producer, Vocals, Guitar, Writer for The Only Good Thing About Leavin''' and I Wanted You to Know Prisoner of Hope - Chris Falson, 2004, Music Epicenter - Credited Role: Associate Producer, Backing Vocals, Acoustic Guitar
 Destiny's Calling (Soundtrack) - 2005 - Destiny Records - Credited Role: Producer, Composer
 Feather - Feather, 2005, Surrender Records - Credited Role: Producer, Vocals, Guitar, Writer of Psalm and Believin
 Mariner's Christmas with Jeffrey Foskett & Michael Campion, 2005, Music Epicenter - Credited Role: Producer, Vocals, Guitar, Writer for Merry Christmas (Say What You Mean)  
 Where Is She? (Soundtrack) - 2008 - Music Epicenter - Credited Role: Producer, Writer for Dance All Night  
 Dance All Night - The Raymies, 2009, Music Epicenter - Credited Role: Producer,  Writer for Too Soon to Tell, I Can't Wait, Nothin' Seems to Rhyme, Good Day, I Love You More, UP2U, You & Me, Dance All Night, Why Won't You Talk To Me, Someday, Tell Me Raymies Rules - The Raymies, 2009, Music Epicenter - Credited Role: Producer, Arranger, Writer for Dance All Night, Kalina, Where Are You?, UP2U, Things You Should Know, I Can't Wait, Too Soon to Tell The Raymies Christmas - The Raymies, 2009, Music Epicenter - Credited Role: Producer, Arranger, Writer for At Christmas Time 
 Enough - LJCC Live, 2009, Bulldog Records - Credited Role: Producer, Vocals, Guitar
 Enough 2 - LJCC Live, 2010, Bulldog Records - Credited Role: Producer, Arranger, Vocals, Guitar, Additional Lyrics for Some Kind of Wonderful Cure Across The World - Cure Across The World, 2010, CATW Records - Credited Role: Producer, Vocals, Writer for UP2U My American Friend (Soundtrack) - 2011, Rainbow S.r.l. - Credited Role: Producer, Writer for Here We Go Spontaneity - Kylie Campion, 2011, Music Epicenter - Credited Role: Producer
 Places We Would Go - Rocky's Revival, 2012, Music Epicenter - Credited Role: Producer, Bass, Baritone, Writer for Places We Would Go, Breathe In, Breathe Out, Tastes Like Sin Winx Club: The Mystery Of The Abyss (Soundtrack) - 2014, Rainbow S.r.l. - Credited Role: Vocal Producer for We All Are Winx The Live Collection - Chris Falson, 2014, Sounds Dangerous - Credited Role: Vocals and Guitar
 Blue Water Harmony - Blue Water Music Festival, 2015, Blue Water - Credited Role: Producer, Writer for Like a Child Newspaper Dream - Rocky's Revival, 2016, Music Epicenter - Credited Role: Producer, Guitar, Baritone, Writer for Newspaper Dream, It Takes One, With You, Like a Child Maggie & Bianca: Fashion Friends (Soundtrack) - 2016/2017, Rainbow S.r.l. - Credited Role: Music Supervisor, Producer, Guitar, Bass, Writer for Here We Go, I Can't Wait, Relationship Game, Inside Out, Over and Over Again, Love Is Hard (But It's Worth It), Sitting Next to Him Miraculous: Tales of Ladybug & Cat Noir "A Christmas Special" (Soundtrack) - 2016, ZAG Records - Credited Role: Producer, Writer for Miraculous Theme (Christmas Version), It's Gonna Be a Miraculous Christmas, My Christmas Wish Sympathetic Vibrations - Gary Griffin, 2017, ViVid Records - Credited Role: Writer for I Wanted You to Know and Pretend It Isn't There International Pop Overthrow - Volume 20, 2017, IPO Records - Credited Role: Executive Producer for It Had to Be You (Pre-release) 
 Maggie & Bianca: Fashion Friends (Soundtrack Album) Come Le Star - 2017, SONY Music - Credited Role: Producer, Writer for Here We Go, Relationship Game 
 Maggie & Bianca: Fashion Friends (Soundtrack) - 2017, Rainbow S.r.L. Credited Role: Producer, Writer for I Can't Wait, Inside Out 
 Heathens - Kalina & Kiana, 2017, Music Epicenter - Credited Role: Producer 
 Silent Night - Kalina & Kiana, 2017, Music Epicenter - Credited Role: Producer
 His Name Shall Be - (from the motion picture “The Annunciation”) Kalina & Kiana, 2018, Music Epicenter - Credited Role: Producer, Writer
 The Sound of Silence - Kalina & Kiana, 2018, Music Epicenter - Credited Role: Co-Producer
 That Girl’s In Love - Kalina & Kiana, 2018, Music Epicenter - Credited Role: Co-Producer, Writer
 Say What You Want - Kalina & Kiana, 2018, Music Epicenter - Credited Role: Co-Producer, Writer
 Shame On Me - Kalina & Kiana, 2018, Music Epicenter - Credited Role: Co-Producer, Writer
 It Had To Be You - Kalina & Kiana, 2018, Music Epicenter - Credited Role: Co-Producer, Writer
 Songs for Social Change (Volume 2) Compilation, 2018, RAWA Records - Credited Role: Producer, Writer for It Takes One
 Maggie & Bianca: Fashion Friends (Soundtrack Album) Hands Up - 2018, SONY Music - Credited Role: Producer, Writer for Over and Over Again, Love Is Hard (But It's Worth It), Sitting Next to Him
 Kyren (Original Motion Picture Soundtrack) Cameron London, 2018, Kyren Records - Credited Role: Co-Producer, Writer for Say What You Want
 That Summer, Vol Two (Various Artists) - 2019, That Summer - Credited Role: Co-Producer, Writer for That Thing''
 That Thing - Kalina & Kiana, 2019, Music Epicenter - Credited Role: Co-Producer, Writer
 Gold - Kalina & Kiana, 2019, Music Epicenter - Credited Role: Co-Producer, Writer
 She Is - Kalina & Kiana, 2020, Music Epicenter - Credited Role: Co-Producer, Writer
 Golden Age - Kalina & Kiana, 2020, Music Epicenter - Credited Role: Co-Producer, Writer
 Hungry Heart- Victoria Bailey, 2020, Rock Ridge Music - Credited Role: Vocal Producer
 Sunshine - Kalina & Kiana, 2021, Music Epicenter - Credited Role: Co-Producer, Writer
 Rider In The Rain- Victoria Bailey, 2021, Rock Ridge Music - Credited Role: Vocal Producer
 Something New - Kalina & Kiana, 2021, Music Epicenter - Credited Role: Co-Producer, Writer
 At Christmas Time (How Could He Do This To Me?) - Kalina & Kiana, 2021, Music Epicenter - Credited Role: Co-Producer, Writer
 Golden Age (Live) - Kalina & Kiana, 2022, Music Epicenter - Credited Role: Co-Producer, Writer
 Peter Pan Rd - Kalina & Kiana, 2022, Music Epicenter - Credited Role: Co-Producer, Writer

Jingles 
Advertising: Television & Radio Commercials

Film & Television

Music Videos

References

External links
Official website
Project website
Michael Campion at the Internet Movie Database
All Music
Michael Campion Interview NAMM Oral History Library (2022)
Linkedin

Songwriters from Washington (state)
Record producers from Washington (state)
American music people